Ponte do Arquinho is a Roman bridge from the 1st century located in Valpaços, Portugal.

References

See also
List of bridges in Portugal

Bridges in Portugal
Buildings and structures in Vila Real District